Egotheism or Autotheism  is the deification or worship of the self. Critics of Johann Gottlieb Fichte and Ralph Waldo Emerson used the terms to label their Transcendental philosophy. Autolatry is another synonym which was used to label the ideology of Max Stirner.

Ancient religions
Several Egyptian kings declared themselves gods during their reign. Identification of the atman (self) with Brahman is a tenet of some sects of Hinduism. In Jainism, one who extinguishes all of their karmas becomes a tirthankara with godlike knowledge and powers.

Modern religions
Founder of North Korea Kim Il-Sung instituted worship of himself amongst the citizens and it is considered the only country to deify its ruler. Henry VIII was accused of autolatry after becoming a Protestant and establishing Anglicanism. After he reconverted to Protestantism, Jean-Jacques Rousseau advocated civil religion which was accused of inspiring self worship amongst citizenry. Early individuals that declared themselves to be god include Englishman John Robins (prophet) and Danilo Filipov, who led a heterodox Quaker cult in Russia.  Contemporary figures who have professed themselves to be deities include Father Divine and Jim Jones. Mormonism is a religion that teaches self deification.

See also
 Apotheosis
 Church of Satan
 Divinization
 God complex
 Self religion
 The Essence of Christianity
 Theosis (Eastern Christian theology)

References

 Peabody, Elizabeth Palmer. “Egotheism, the Atheism of To-Day” 1858, (reprinted in 1886 in her Last Evening with Allston)

Conceptions of God
Theism